William James McBride, CBE, better known as Willie John McBride (born 6 June 1940) is a former rugby union footballer who played as a lock for Ireland and the British and Irish Lions. He played 63 Tests for Ireland including eleven as captain, and toured with the Lions five times; a record that gave him 17 Lions Test caps. He also captained the most successful ever Lions side, which toured South Africa in 1974.

Youth
McBride was born at Toomebridge, County Antrim.  Owing to his father's death when he was four years old, he spent most of his spare time helping out on his family farm. Because of this he did not start playing rugby until he was 17. He was educated at Ballymena Academy and played for the school's First XV. After he left he joined 
Ballymena R.F.C.

Playing career
In 1962 McBride was selected to play for Ireland. His  first Test on 10 February 1962 was against England at Twickenham. Later that year he was selected to tour South Africa with the British and Irish Lions.

McBride continued to play for Ireland throughout the 1960s and played for Ireland when they first defeated South Africa (the Springboks) in 1965, and when Ireland defeated Australia in Sydney — the first time a Home Nations team had defeated a major southern hemisphere team in their own country. He was again selected for the Lions in 1966, this time touring New Zealand and Australia. He toured South Africa with the Lions again in 1968.

He was selected to play for the Lions in their 1971 tour of New Zealand. Despite being criticized by some as being "over the hill", McBride was made pack leader and helped the Lions to a Test series win over New Zealand; their first and last series win over New Zealand. He received an MBE in 1971 for services to rugby football.

1974 Lions tour to South Africa
McBride's leadership qualities led to his appointment as captain of the British and Irish Lions in their 1974 tour to South Africa. The Test series was won 3–0, with one match drawn; the first Lions series ever won in South Africa. It was one of the most controversial and physical Test match series ever played. The management of the Lions concluded that the Springboks dominated their opponents with physical aggression, and so decided to match fire with fire. Willie John McBride instigated a policy of "one in, all in": that is, when one Lion retaliated, all other Lions were expected to join in the melee or hit the nearest Springbok.

At that time there were only substitutions if a doctor agreed that a player was physically unable to continue and there were no video cameras and sideline officials to keep the punching, kicking and head butting to a minimum. If the South Africans were to resort to foul play then the Lions decided "to get their retaliation in first." The signal for this was to call "99" (a shortened version of the emergency number in Ireland and in the United Kingdom: 999). This was a signal for the Lions to clobber their nearest rival players.

Retirement
In 1975 as his international career was ending he played his last game for Ireland at Lansdowne Road. The game was against France, and near the end of the match he scored his first test try for Ireland. It was the crowning moment of a great playing career. His last international game was against Wales on Saturday 15 March 1975.

After retiring from playing the game, McBride coached the Irish team and was manager of the 1983 Lions tour to New Zealand. Despite the test results being mainly poor, team camaraderie was high and some good wins were recorded in other games. In 1997 he was an inaugural inductee into the International Rugby Hall of Fame. He lives in Ballyclare. He has been asked to present Test jerseys and give motivational speeches to Lions players prior to matches. In 2004 he was named in Rugby World magazine as "Rugby Personality of the Century". He is a major supporter of the Wooden Spoon Society.

McBride was awarded a CBE in the 2019 New Year Honours list for services to Rugby Union.

References

External links

Bibliography 

 Encyclopdea of World Rugby published 1995.

1940 births
Living people
Ballymena R.F.C. players
Barbarian F.C. players
British & Irish Lions rugby union players from Ireland
Commanders of the Order of the British Empire
Ireland international rugby union players
Ireland national rugby union team coaches
Irish rugby union coaches
Members of the Order of the British Empire
People educated at Ballymena Academy
Rugby union locks
Rugby union players from County Antrim
Sportsmen from Northern Ireland
Ulster Rugby players
World Rugby Hall of Fame inductees